Anchylobela phaulodes is a species of snout moth in the genus Anchylobela. It was described by Alfred Jefferis Turner in 1947, and is known from Queensland, Australia.

References

Moths described in 1947
Anerastiini
Moths of Australia